Onda (stylized in all caps) is the third studio album by South Korean rock band Jambinai. It was released on June 7, 2019, by Bella Union.

Critical reception

Onda was met with widespread acclaim reviews from critics.  Hans Kim of PopMatters described "Onda as "a project that interweaves diasporic influences just as heterophony interweaves distinct melodies."

Track listing

References

2019 albums
Jambinai albums